Artūras Kasputis (born 26 February 1967) is a retired track and road racing cyclist from Lithuania, who represented the USSR at the 1988 Summer Olympics in Seoul, South Korea. There he won the gold medal in the men's 4.000 team pursuit, alongside Viacheslav Ekimov, Dmitry Nelyubin and Gintautas Umaras. During the Soviet time he trained at Dynamo sports society in Klaipėda. He was a professional road cyclist from 1992 to 2002, and afterwards became a cycling manager in the professional circuit.

Major results

1987
1st  Overall Tour du Maroc
1990
1st Stage 1 Vuelta a Colombia
1991
1st  Overall Circuito Montañés
1st Circuit du Port de Dunkerque
Vuelta a Colombia
1st Prologue & Stage 7
3rd Overall Ronde de l'Isard
3rd Overall Tour du Poitou Charentes et de la Vienne
1992
1st Route d'Occitanie
1st  Overall Route du Sud
1st Stage 2a (ITT)
1st Chrono des Herbiers
5th Overall Vuelta a Murcia
6th Grand Prix des Nations
1993
2nd Overall Ronde de l'Isard
1994
1st Stage 1a Route du Sud (ITT)
3rd Overall Critérium du Dauphiné Libéré
4th Overall Tour de Luxembourg
4th Chrono des Herbiers
1995
5th Overall Tour du Limousin
6th Overall Circuit Cycliste Sarthe
1996
1st Stage 1 Critérium du Dauphiné Libéré
5th Overall 4 Jours de Dunkerque
9th Overall Circuit Cycliste Sarthe
1997
8th Overall Route du Sud
9th Overall 4 Jours de Dunkerque
1998
2nd Overall 4 Jours de Dunkerque
2nd Overall Tour du Vaucluse
5th Overall Circuit des Mines
1999
1st  Overall Circuit des Mines
1st Stage 7 (ITT)
1st Prologue Tour de l'Ain
 National Road Championships
2nd Time trial
6th Road race
8th Grand Prix des Nations
2000
1st Stage 4b Danmark Rundt (ITT)
2nd Overall 4 Jours de Dunkerque
1st Stage 2
9th Overall Tour de Picardie
10th Overall Étoile de Bessèges
2001
7th Overall Circuit des Mines
2002
3rd Overall Circuit Cycliste de la Sarthe
7th Overall Tour of Belgium
9th Overall Grote Prijs Erik Breukink

References

External links

1967 births
Living people
Lithuanian male cyclists
Soviet male cyclists
Lithuanian track cyclists
Cyclists at the 1988 Summer Olympics
Cyclists at the 1996 Summer Olympics
Cyclists at the 2000 Summer Olympics
Olympic cyclists of the Soviet Union
Olympic cyclists of Lithuania
Olympic gold medalists for the Soviet Union
Dynamo sports society athletes
Olympic medalists in cycling
Sportspeople from Klaipėda
Medalists at the 1988 Summer Olympics
Honoured Masters of Sport of the USSR